is a train station in Takahashi, Okayama Prefecture, Japan.

Lines
West Japan Railway Company
Hakubi Line

Adjacent stations

Hakubi Line
Railway stations in Okayama Prefecture
Railway stations in Japan opened in 1928